There have been many commentaries on the biblical Book of Job.

Selecta of Job by Origen (d. c. 253)
Commenttarium on Iob by Maximinus the Arian (4th century)
a commentary by Pseudo-Ignatius (4th century)
Exerpta in Job by Athanasius of Alexandria (d. 373)
a commentary by Didymus the Blind (d. 398)
a commentary by Hesychius of Jerusalem (5th century)
a commentary by Julian the Arian (5th century)
a fragmentary commentary by Elishaʿ bar Quzbaye (5th/6th century)
Moralia in Job (578–595) by Gregory the Great
a commentary by Moses ibn Gikatilla (11th century)
a fragmentary commentary by Eliezer of Beaugency (12th century)
Expositio in Job ad litteram (1260) by Thomas Aquinas
Mazmerot Kesef by Joseph Ibn Kaspi (d. 1345)
a commentary by Abba Mari ben Eligdor (14th century)
a commentary by Joel ibn Shu'aib (15th century)
Piẓ'ei Ohev by Israel ben Moses Najara (d. c. 1625)
a commentary by Joseph Caryl (d. 1673)
Kommentar zum Hiob (1839) by Ludwig Hirzel
Safah le-ne'emanim (1854) by Naḥman Isaac Fischmann
Commentary on Job (1886) by Benjamin Szold
The New World (1942), published by the Watch Tower Society
Job: An Introduction and Commentary (1976) by Francis Andersen
A Commentary on Job: Now Mine Eye Seeth Thee by Homer Hailey (d. 2000)
Deconstructing Theodicy: A Philosophical Commentary on Job (2008) by David Burrell